Bill Handson (born 3 December 1954) is a Canadian rugby union player. He played in nine matches for the Canada national rugby union team from 1985 to 1987, including three matches at the 1987 Rugby World Cup.

References

1954 births
Living people
Canadian rugby union players
Canada international rugby union players
Place of birth missing (living people)